The Canadian Champion Older Female Horse is a  Canadian Thoroughbred horse racing honour created in 1975 by the Jockey Club of Canada. It is part of the Sovereign Awards program and is awarded annually to the top Thoroughbred  Filly four years of age and older competing in Canada. The award was renamed to Champion Older Main Track Female before the 2019 Sovereign Awards.

Past winners

1975 : Victorian Queen
1976 : Momigi
1977 : Reasonable Win
1978 : Christy's Mount
1979 : La Voyageuse
1980 : Glorious Song
1981 : Glorious Song
1982 : Eternal Search
1983 : Eternal Search
1984 : Sintrillium
1985 : Lake Country
1986 : Bessarabian
1987 : Carotene
1988 : Carotene
1989 : Proper Evidence
1990 : Diva's Debut
1991 : Avant's Gold
1992 : Wilderness Song
1993 : Dance for Donna
1994 : Pennyhill Park
1995 : Bold Ruritana
1996 : Windsharp
1997 : Woolloomooloo
1998 : Santa Amelia
1999 : Magic Code
2000 : Saoirse
2001 : Mountain Angel
2002 : Small Promises
2003 : One For Rose
2004 : One For Rose
2005 : One For Rose
2006 : Financingavailable
2007 : Financingavailable
2008 : Bear Now
2009 : Serenading
2010 : Impossible Time
2011 : Embur's Song
2012 : Roxy Gap
2013 : Sisterly Love
2014 : Strut the Course
2015 : Miss Mischief 
2016 : Midnight Miley
2017 : Ami's Mesa
2018 : Escape Clause
2019 : Here's Hannah
2020 : Souper Escape

References

The Sovereign Awards at the Jockey Club of Canada website

Sovereign Award winners
Horse racing awards
Horse racing in Canada